Mother of Mine may refer to:

 "Mother o' Mine", a poem by Rudyard Kipling
 "That Old Irish Mother of Mine", a 1920 song written by William Jerome
 Mother of Mine, I Still Have You, 1928 record by Al Jolson
 "Oh Mother of Mine", a 1961 Miracle label single by Motown singing group The Temptations
 "Mother of Mine" (song), a 1971 song by Neil Reid with many later covers
 Mother of Mine (film), a 2005 Finnish-Swedish film
 Mother of Mine (TV series), a 2019 South Korean television series
See also
 Example of double genitive